The second and final season of the American streaming television series Iron Fist, which is based on the Marvel Comics character of the same name, follows Danny Rand / Iron Fist, a martial arts expert with the ability to call upon the power of the Iron Fist. It is set in the Marvel Cinematic Universe (MCU), sharing continuity with the films and other television series of the franchise. The season was produced by Marvel Television in association with ABC Studios, with Raven Metzner serving as showrunner.

Finn Jones stars as Rand, who protects New York following the events of The Defenders. Jessica Henwick, Tom Pelphrey, Jessica Stroup, and Sacha Dhawan also return from the first season to star and are joined by Simone Missick, reprising her role from previous Marvel Netflix series, and Alice Eve. The season was ordered in July 2017, with Metzner replacing Scott Buck as showrunner. Filming for the season began in late 2017 in New York City and continued until May 2018. Focus was placed on improving the fight sequences for the series after criticisms of the first season, with Clayton Barber taking over as fight coordinator after doing so for the MCU film Black Panther. Each episode in the season is named after a comics issue that Rand has appeared in.

The season was released on September 7, 2018, and consists of ten episodes. The season received mixed reviews from critics but was considered a major improvement over the previous season. Netflix canceled the series on October 12, 2018.

Episodes

Cast and characters

Main
 Finn Jones as Danny Rand / Iron Fist
 Jessica Henwick as Colleen Wing
 Tom Pelphrey as Ward Meachum
 Jessica Stroup as Joy Meachum
 Sacha Dhawan as Davos
 Simone Missick as Misty Knight
 Alice Eve as "Typhoid Mary" Walker

Recurring
 Giullian Yao Gioiello as BB
 Natalie Smith as Bethany
 Jason Lai as Rhyno
 Christine Toy Johnson as Sherry Yang
 James Chen as Sam Chung
 Jowin Marie Batoon as Torx
 Sydney Mae Diaz as Hex
 Fernando Chien as Chen Wu

Notable guests
 Henry Yuk as Hai-Qing Yang
 Hoon Lee as Lei Kung
 Andrew Pang as Donnie Chang
 Murray Bartlett as Paul Edmonds
 Rob Morgan as Turk Barrett

Production

Development
In January 2015, Netflix CCO Ted Sarandos stated the series was "eligible to go into multiple seasons for sure" and Netflix would look at "how well [they] are addressing both the Marvel fanbase but also the broader fanbase" in terms of determining whether additional seasons would be appropriate. In July 2015, Sarandos said some of the Defenders series would "selectively have multiple seasons as they come out of the gate." At San Diego Comic-Con International 2017, the second season of Iron Fist was announced, with Raven Metzner taking over as showrunner from Scott Buck, who served that role for the first season. Marvel Television head and series executive producer Jeph Loeb explained that Marvel had known Buck would be unavailable for the next season of Iron Fist due to his commitments to another Marvel series, Inhumans, so the studio began looking for a replacement showrunner. Metzner pitched a story for the season that excited Marvel, and Loeb compared the change to a new writer taking over on a comic.

Writing
The season begins after the events of The Defenders, and sees Rand fulfill his promise to protect New York following the supposed death of Matt Murdock at the end of that miniseries. For the season, Metzner also wanted to explore more of the mythology of K'un-Lun than was shown in the first season by spending more time there. Each episode is named after the issue title of various comics Danny Rand has appeared in, after the first season named each episode after Shaolin Kung Fu sequences.

When asked how the season would be influenced by the criticisms of the first, Metzner said that Marvel had allowed him to tell his own story rather than follow on from the first season and so he just approached the project as a fan of the comics and characters. He described the second season as an "evolution" of the first. Jones felt that Rand would be more relatable for the audience in the second season after moving in with his girlfriend and spending less time around Rand Enterprises. Metzner described this approach as "holistic", wanting the series to feel like being on the streets of New York.

Casting
Finn Jones, Jessica Henwick, Tom Pelphrey, Jessica Stroup, and Sacha Dhawan reprise their roles as Danny Rand / Iron Fist, Colleen Wing, Ward Meachum, Joy Meachum, and Davos, respectively. They are joined in the season by Alice Eve as Typhoid Mary. Metzner had previously written a different version of Typhoid Mary for the film Elektra (2005), and was always interested in that character and well-versed in her comic story. Eve described her introduction in the season as an origin story that explores the mystery of the character's multiple personalities, while Loeb said, "We meet her at a certain point in her life and then cards get tipped over as you go."

With the announcement of the season, it was revealed that Simone Missick would appear, reprising her role as Misty Knight from previous MCU Netflix series. This allows for the exploration of the Daughters of the Dragon team that Wing and Knight form in the comics. James Chen had also joined the cast as Sam Chung, a role loosely based on the comics supporting character of the same name.

Filming
Filming for the season was expected to begin "soon" after it was announced at San Diego Comic-Con, with actor Sacha Dhawan saying then that "they're hopefully starting" by December 2017. By December 13, filming on the season had begun, in New York City where the production wrapped on May 10, 2018. Jones described this as the end of a "long and physical 7 month winter shoot". Extensive filming took place in New York's Chinatown. Niels Alpert served as cinematographer for the season.

Clayton Barber took over as the fight coordinator for the season, having also served in the role on Marvel's Black Panther (2018), after the fight choreography of the first season was widely criticized. Barber was inspired by "old school kung fu" such as the works of Jackie Chan, and wanted to make the fights of the series feel like "a punk rock song". Metzner noted that Jones had months of lead time before work on the season began to "hone his skills" with the fighting and stunts, and said that he and the rest of the cast along with Barber "really pushed themselves" with the fight sequences in the season. Jones added that all of the fight scenes have "an emotional standpoint" so that they drive the story forward rather than simply being "awesome fight scenes" for the sake of having fights.

Music
Robert Lydecker composed the music for the season.

Marvel Cinematic Universe tie-ins
The fictional country of Sokovia that was introduced in the MCU film Avengers: Age of Ultron (2015) is referenced in the season as part of Walker's past as an operative in the country.

Marketing
Jones, Henwick, Missick, Eve, Loeb, Metzner, and Barber promoted the season at San Diego Comic-Con 2018. Charles Pulliam-Moore of io9 felt the footage shown at the panel left him optimistic for the season, since "It finally feels like Iron Fist may have figured out what people wanted out of this show in the first place." He felt the clips showed "how drastic an improvement" there was to the fight choreography, thanks in part to new fight coordinator Barber joining the series. One clip that showed Rand facing Davos in K'un-Lun felt "brutal and bloody" while also being "fluid and elegant in a way that feels fresh, new, and  like what you want from Iron Fist." At the panel, Loeb appeared in a karate costume, as part of a comedic bit with Henwick, who later appeared on stage telling Loeb to remove the outfit. Some criticized the outfit as insensitive and "several layers of bad".

Release
The second season of Iron Fist, consisting of ten episodes, was released on September 7, 2018, on the streaming service Netflix worldwide, in Ultra HD 4K and high dynamic range. The season, along with the additional Iron Fist season and the other Marvel Netflix series, was removed from Netflix on March 1, 2022, due to Netflix's license for the series ending and Disney regaining the rights. The season became available on Disney+ in the United States, Canada, United Kingdom, Ireland, Australia, and New Zealand on March 16, ahead of its debut in Disney+'s other markets by the end of 2022.

Critical response
The review aggregation website Rotten Tomatoes reported a 55% approval rating, based on 47 reviews, with an average rating of 5.70/10. The website's critical consensus reads, "Better action scenes and tighter pacing elevate Iron Fists second season, but it remains a lesser light among MCU shows." Metacritic assigned a score of 39 out of 100 based on reviews from six critics, indicating "generally unfavorable reviews".

References

External links 
 

2018 American television seasons
02